Popowo may refer to the following places:
Popowo, Gmina Lipno in Kuyavian-Pomeranian Voivodeship (north-central Poland)
Popowo, Gmina Tłuchowo in Kuyavian-Pomeranian Voivodeship (north-central Poland)
Popowo, Wałcz County in West Pomeranian Voivodeship (north-west Poland)
Popowo, Augustów County in Podlaskie Voivodeship (north-east Poland)
Popowo, Grajewo County in Podlaskie Voivodeship (north-east Poland)
Popowo, Międzychód County in Greater Poland Voivodeship (west-central Poland)
Popowo, Oborniki County in Greater Poland Voivodeship (west-central Poland)
Popowo, Szamotuły County in Greater Poland Voivodeship (west-central Poland)
Popowo, Międzyrzecz County in Lubusz Voivodeship (west Poland)
Popowo, Nowa Sól County in Lubusz Voivodeship (west Poland)
Popowo, Lębork County in Pomeranian Voivodeship (north Poland)
Popowo, Nowy Dwór Gdański County in Pomeranian Voivodeship (north Poland)
Popowo, Warmian-Masurian Voivodeship (north Poland)
Popowo, Koszalin County in West Pomeranian Voivodeship (north-west Poland)

See also
 Popovo (disambiguation)
 Popów (disambiguation)